Ouled Rahmoun is a town and commune in Constantine Province, Algeria. According to the 1998 census it has a population of 20,434.

References

Communes of Constantine Province
Cities in Algeria
Algeria